The Oregon Mirror was an African-American newspaper founded by Jimmy "Bang Bang" Walker and Don Alford in 1961. Along with the Northwest Defender, it was identified as one of the two Black newspapers of "Albinatown" in the early 1960s.

Walker was a dynamic figure in Portland society, described in an Oregonian article as "former boxer, barber, longshoreman, newspaper publisher, editor and reporter, entrepreneur, deejay, legislative candidate, Santa Claus, promoter and advocate of civil rights." He was profiled in the Oregonian in 1999.

References

Archives 
 :File:Oregon Mirror March 21, 1962.pdf
 :File:Oregon Mirror April 25, 1962.pdf

Defunct newspapers published in Oregon
Defunct African-American newspapers
Newspapers established in 1961
Year of disestablishment missing
1961 establishments in Oregon